"Fair Antigua, We Salute Thee" is the national anthem of Antigua and Barbuda. Written by Novelle Hamilton Richards and composed by Walter Garnet Picart Chambers, it was adopted in 1967 while Antigua and Barbuda were still a British colony. It was adopted as the national anthem upon independence in 1981.

Lyrics

Former 1967-1981 lyrics 
I

Fair Antigua we salute thee

Proudly we this Anthem raise

To thy glory and thy beauty

Joyfully we sing the praise

Of the virtues all bestowed

On thy sons and daughters free

Ever striving, ever seeking

Dwell in Love and Unity.

References

External links 
Streaming audio of Fair Antigua, We Salute Thee with lyrics and information (archive link)

National symbols of Antigua and Barbuda
North American anthems
1967 songs
National anthems